Phil Dowling (born 22 June 1967) is a New Zealand curler.

At the national level, he is a two-time New Zealand men's champion curler (2011, 2016).

Teams

References

External links

Philip Dowling on the New Zealand Curling Association database

Living people
1967 births
New Zealand male curlers
New Zealand curling champions
21st-century New Zealand people